Yitzhak "Itzik" Kornfein (born 24 September 1971 in Jerusalem) is a retired Israeli goalkeeper who played mostly for Beitar Jerusalem. He also played for Hapoel Tiberias, Hapoel Jerusalem, Hapoel Ramat Gan, Hapoel Petah Tikva and Beitar Tel Aviv. In international football, Kornfein was capped at under-18 and under-21 level, and played five times for the senior national team.

Kornfein started playing for the youth team of Hapoel Jerusalem but after moving to Beitar in 1995, he became a true symbol and icon for Beitar fans. In his last 6 years as an active player, Kornfein was the captain of the Beitar Jerusalem squad.

Kornfein won five titles as a player for Beitar : 
3 Championships : 1997, 1998, 2007
1 Toto cup 1997/8 (23 December 1997)
1 Peace cup 2000 (10 September 2000, in Rome)
including back-to-back Championships in 1997 and 1998. 
Few days before the beginning of training sessions previous to the 07-08 playing season, Korenfine announced his retirement as a player. He was then named as the club's general manager.

Kornfein holds a BA in Economics and Marketing from the Open University of Israel, and an MA in Business Administration from the Hebrew University of Jerusalem.

References

1971 births
Living people
Israeli Jews
Israeli footballers
Hapoel Tiberias F.C. players
Hapoel Jerusalem F.C. players
Hapoel Ramat Gan F.C. players
Hapoel Petah Tikva F.C. players
Beitar Tel Aviv F.C. players
Beitar Jerusalem F.C. players
Liga Leumit players
Israeli Premier League players
Footballers from Jerusalem
Jerusalem School of Business Administration alumni
Open University of Israel alumni
Israel under-21 international footballers
Israel international footballers
Association football goalkeepers